Poretskoye (Păraçkav) is a rural locality (a selo) and the administrative center of Poretsky District of the Chuvash Republic, Russia. Population:

Climate

References

Notes

Sources

Rural localities in Chuvashia
Alatyrsky Uyezd